This is a list of sultans and later claimants of the former Sulu sultanate. The Royal House of Sulu is a royal house of the Sulu Archipelago in the Philippines. Historically the head of the Sultanate of Sulu, the position of sultan today carries with it no political powers or privileges and is mostly a cultural figure.

There are currently several claimants to the sultanship after the death of the last recognized sultan, Mohammed Mahakuttah A. Kiram.

Pre-sultanate kings
Sulu was divided into three kingdoms before the sultanate arose.

The descendants of Paduka Pahala, through his two sons, live in Dezhou in China have the surnames An and Wen.

Sharif ul-Hāshim of Sulu arrived in Sulu and married the princess Dayang-dayang Paramisuli of the previous royal family, founding the Sulu sultanate.

List of sultans

List of sultans from 1405 to 1936
The following list details the holders of the title of sultan between 1405 and 1936.

List of sultans from 1936 to 1950
By the early 20th century, the sultanate had already declined. Any claimed political sovereignty of the sultanate was formally abolished in 1915. The descendants of the royal family are still recognised and honoured as de facto royalty by the people in Sulu and by others..

After the death of Sultan Jamalul-Kiram II in 1936, the Philippine Government, the successors in sovereignty to the United States of America, decided not to recognise the continued existence of the Sulu sultanate, according to a letter to the governor of North Borneo dated 28 July 1936, from the British Consul General in Manila. After that decision several legitimate claimants and pretenders to the throne of Sulu appeared. During World War II, Japanese and American forces exerted influence in sultanate's affairs, each recognising a pretender supportive of their agenda.

List of sultans from 1950 to 1986

In 1962, the Philippine government under President Diosdado Macapagal officially recognised the continued existence of the Sulu sultanate and, on 24 May 1974, officially recognised Sultan Mohammad Mahakuttah Kiram (reigned 1974–1986), under Memo Order 427, which was issued by Philippine President Ferdinand Marcos, and which stated that "The Government has always recognised the Sultanate of Sulu as the legitimate claimant to the historical territories of the Republic of Philippines" and that Mahakuttah A. Kiram is officially recognised as the Sultan of Sulu with the government being obligated to support his coronation on that date, his 8-year-old eldest son, Muedzul Lail Tan Kiram, being crowned beside his father as Raja Muda (Crown Prince). On 16 February 1986, Muedzul Lail Tan Kiram, succeeded his father to become the head of the Sulu royal house. As the eldest son of the former Sultan Mahakuttah, he is the legitimate heir to the throne of the Sultanate of Sulu.

The following list details the holders of the title Sultan between 1950 and 1986, who are officially recognised by the Philippine Government.

List of self-proclaimed sultans from 1980 to 2013, as recognised by the provincial government of Sulu
After the death of Sultan Mahakuttah A. Kiram, the Philippine national government has not formally recognised a new sultan. Mahakutta's Crown Prince Muedzul Lail Kiram, the heir to the throne according to the line of succession as recognised by the Philippine governments from 1915 to 1986, was 20 years old upon his father's death. Due to his young age, he failed to claim the throne at a time of political instability in the Philippines that led to peaceful revolution and the subsequent removal of President Marcos. The gap in the sultanate leadership was filled by claimants from rival branches. Therefore, the following sultans were not crowned with the support of, nor received formal recognition from, the Philippine government as their predecessors had until 1986.  However, the Philippine national government has participated in discussions with one or more of these claimants regarding issues concerning the sultanate's affairs.

The current claimants
These are the current claimants.

See also
 List of current pretenders
 Pretender
 Monarchy abolishment

References

External links
 Line of succession of the Sultans of Sulu of the Modern Era
 Treaty of Friendship between the Kingdom of Bunyoro-Kitara (Uganda) and the Sultanate of Sulu and North Borneo

 
Filipino datus, rajas and sultans